Alexander Stoffel (12 November 1928 – 24 September 2017) was a Swiss equestrian. He competed at the 1952 Summer Olympics and the 1956 Summer Olympics.

References

External links
 

1928 births
2017 deaths
Swiss male equestrians
Olympic equestrians of Switzerland
Equestrians at the 1952 Summer Olympics
Equestrians at the 1956 Summer Olympics
Sportspeople from Geneva
20th-century Swiss people